European University of Law and Administration (EULA) established in Warsaw (Poland, EU) is a private Polish University founded in 1997.

The EULA is affiliated with the Institute of Legal Studies of the Polish Academy of Sciences.

The EULA was founded by the Warsaw Branch Office of the Polish Lawyers Union, in close cooperation with Institute of Legal Studies of the Polish Academy of Sciences, and with the International Development Law Institute (IDLI) of Rome.

School Authorities

Honorary Rector: Jerzy Wiatr
Rector: Dariusz Czajka
Vice-rector: Tadeusz Szymanek
Dean of the Faculty of Law in Warsaw: Barbara Bajor
Vice-Dean of the Faculty of Law in Warsaw: Artur Kotowski
Dean of the Faculty of Law in London: Waldemar Gontarski
Vice-Dean of the Faculty of Law in London: Jakub Spurek
Chancellor: Katarzyna Zajac

Programs in English

 3-year BA in International Relations

Programs in Polish

 5-year MA in LAW
 3-year BA in Administration
 3-year BA in International Relations

Location

The school's campus is located in the north-eastern district of Warsaw, Praga Północ. The School also conducts classes in central Warsaw, London, and Brussels.

Contact
Address: 21/29 Grodzieńska str., Warsaw, Poland
Phone: + 48 (22) 619 90 11, 619 24 90  
Coordinator of Foreign Student's Affairs: Marzena Kudyba

External links
 (pl)  Official website of the EULA University
 (en) Informations for International Students

Law schools in Poland
Universities and colleges in Warsaw
Business schools in Poland